The Wandering Madman (in Czech: Potulný šílenec, JW 4/43) is a choral composition for soprano, tenor, baritone and male chorus, written in 1922 by the Czech composer Leoš Janáček to the words of a poem by Rabindranath Tagore. It was inspired by Tagore's 1921 lecture in Czechoslovakia. The Wandering Madman is considered one of the most important of Janáček's choral works.

Background and structure 
In June 1921, Janáček attended a lecture in Prague given by Tagore. He later mentioned the lecture in an article for the Lidové noviny newspaper. He took down the writer's "speech melodies" and apparently found an inspiration in his poems. The next year, from July to November, he composed a choral work based on a poem by Tagore. The poem was translated to the Czech language under the title Potulný šílenec (transl. F. Balej).

The Wandering Madman premiered in Rosice u Brna on 21 September 1924 in a performance by Pěvecké sdružení moravských učitelů (PSMU) (The Choral Society of Moravian Teachers) with soprano solo Eliška Janečková and conductor Ferdinand Vach. The same year, the composition was performed with the composer in attendance in Prague's Mozarteum, as a part of a concert organized by the Prague Conservatory.

The composition is scored for soprano, tenor, baritone and TTBB choir. The duration of the work is approximately five minutes. The autograph is dated 12 November 1922.

The Janáček specialist Alena Němcová wrote about the composition: "Janáček in this work examines the human fate and looks back on the extremely difficult finding his own way, in which each step was a step of fierce searching. In the fate of the wandering madman, who again looks for a "touchstone", we see a true picture of Janáček's life..."

The gravestone of the Janáček's grave at the Central Cemetery in Brno bears a copy of several bars of the autograph manuscript and the inscription "... with his strength gone, and his heart in the dust, like a tree ...", borrowed from the work.

Words 
For his composition, Janáček used a story from Tagore's book The Gardener (1913):

Score

Recordings 
Janáček, Leoš: Male Choruses CD, (Prague Philharmonic Choir, cond. Josef Veselka). Supraphon, recorded in 1977, published in 1995. (SU 3022-2 211)

References 

Compositions by Leoš Janáček
Choral compositions
1922 compositions